The Toyota Center is a multi-purpose arena in the northwest United States, located in Kennewick, Washington.

Opened  in 1988 as the Tri-Cities Coliseum, the arena's name was changed in 2004 to the Three Rivers Coliseum to match the Three Rivers Convention Center, which was built next door in the same year. In October 2005, a deal was reached between the city of Kennewick and Toyota, which agreed to pay $2 million over ten years for naming rights.  The city uses the funds for needed improvements and upgrades to the facility. A smaller facility next door, built by the city in 1998, was named "Toyota Arena."

In 2016, the Kennewick Public Facilities District will put to the voters an expansion of what is now known as the Three Rivers Complex.  This expansion is called The Link, an ambitious $35 million project that would build a 2,300-seat theater, add  of convention space, and renovate the arena.

The Toyota Center is located west of central Kennewick, just northwest of Vista Field, which closed  in 2013.

Sports
The Toyota Center is home to the Western Hockey League's Tri-City Americans hockey team. The center was formerly the home of the Tri-City Chinook of the Continental Basketball Association and the Tri-Cities Fever indoor football team. The seating capacity for hockey is about 6,000.

During the 1990 Goodwill Games in Seattle, the venue was used for ice hockey, since the Kingdome was in use by the Mariners. It has also hosted the state championships for high school volleyball, held in November.

Concerts and shows
The arena is also used for concerts (capacity 7,715), banquets, ice shows, circuses, and trade shows ( of space). Recently, the theatre configuration of the facility has been named "Windermere Theatre", licensed to Seattle-based Windermere Real Estate, and the facility now hosts Broadway shows.

It also hosted acts such as Alice Cooper, Rob Zombie, Slipknot, and Avenged Sevenfold who to date holds the record for largest attendance for any event held, with a sellout of 6,842, based on the configuration for the concert.  The legendary rock band KISS is scheduled to perform on July 10, 2016, and is expected to be the highest grossing and biggest concert ever held at the Toyota Center.  A concert by Shinedown was filmed at the Toyota Center, and aired on Palladia with the title Madness from Washington State.

Other events
The Toyota Center has also hosted yearly Jehovah's Witnesses conventions during the month of July. It has held numerous professional wrestling events: WWE house shows when WWE is taping Monday Night Raw or Friday Night Smackdown or a PPV event in the nearby cities of Spokane, Yakima, Seattle, and Portland, Oregon.

The arena also hosts children's events, such as Sesame Street Live Make a New Friend!, making the venue an attraction for all ages.

See also
 List of sports venues with the name Toyota

References

External links

1990 Goodwill Games venues
Buildings and structures in Benton County, Washington
Indoor arenas in Washington (state)
Indoor ice hockey venues in the United States
Kennewick, Washington
Sports in the Tri-Cities, Washington
Sports venues in Washington (state)
Toyota
Tri-Cities Fever
Tri-City Chinook
Tourist attractions in Benton County, Washington
Western Hockey League arenas
Continental Basketball Association venues